Juke Box Jenny (also known as Fifty Million Nickels) is a 1942 film directed by Harold Young and starring Ken Murray, Harriet Hilliard, Iris Adrian, and Donald Douglas. The film is a musical comedy with songs performed by Charlie Barnet and his Orchestra, The King's Men, Wingy Manone and his Orchestra, The Milt Herth Trio, and The Eddie Beal Trio. The songs include "Fifty Million Nickels Can't Be Wrong", "Swing to Mother Goose", "Tiger Rag", "Macumba", and others.

Plot
Roger Wadsworth, owner of a record company, is pressured by Mrs. Horton, a major stock holder in the company and mother of his fiancé Genevieve, to only produce recordings of classical music. Romantic complications follow with the involvement of his top salesman, Malcolm Hammond, who wants the company to produce jazz records, and a torch singer, Jinx Corey.

Cast
 Ken Murray as Malcolm Hammond
 Harriet Hilliard as Genevieve Horton
 Iris Adrian as Jinx Corey
 Don Douglas as Roger Wadsworth
 Marjorie Gateson as Mrs. Horton
 Sig Arno as Randini
 Charles Halton as the judge
 William Ruhl as Jinx’s lawyer
 Claire Du Brey as Miss Carruthers

Musicians
 Charlie Barnet and His Orchestra
 The King’s Men
 Wingy Manone and His Orchestra
 Milt Hert and His Trio

Reviews
A New York Times review on 17 April 1942 described the movie as "a series of musical shorts strung out to feature-length [...] by means of a feeble yarn."

References

External links
 
 
 
 

1942 films
American black-and-white films
1942 musical films
Films directed by Harold Young (director)
Universal Pictures films
American musical films
1940s English-language films
1940s American films